Tour des Jardins de l'Arche is a 206-meter skyscraper project located in Nanterre, in the business district of La Défense (Hauts-de-Seine, France).

The tower will be located west of the Grande Arche, in the immediate vicinity of the Paris La Défense Arena, the Racing 92 rugby stadium and performance hall.

References

External links
 Official website

Skyscrapers in France
Buildings and structures under construction in France
La Défense